Lasse Jürgensen (born 16 February 1998) is a Danish professional footballer who plays as a midfielder for German club SV Rödinghausen.

References

External links
 

1998 births
Living people
Danish men's footballers
German footballers
Association football midfielders
FC Augsburg II players
SC Verl players
SV Rödinghausen players
Regionalliga players
3. Liga players
Denmark youth international footballers
People from Fürstenfeldbruck (district)
Footballers from Bavaria